Drummondville Airport  is located  east southeast of Drummondville, Quebec, Canada.

The airport is classified as an airport of entry by Nav Canada and is staffed by the Canada Border Services Agency (CBSA). CBSA officers at this airport can handle general aviation aircraft only, with no more than 15 passengers.

See also
 Drummondville Water Aerodrome

References

External links
Page about this airport on COPA's Places to Fly airport directory

Transport in Drummondville
Registered aerodromes in Centre-du-Québec